Ainring is a municipality in the district of Berchtesgadener Land, Upper Bavaria, Germany, near the border to Austria.

After World War II it was the site of a displaced persons camp.

Personalities

Sons and daughters Ainrings 
 Manuela Kraller (born 1981), singer

Connected to Ainring 
 Eugen Sänger (1905-1964), engineer and pioneer in the field of aerospace
 Hans Söllner (born 1955), Bavarian singer-songwriter; lives in Ainring

References 

Berchtesgadener Land
Displaced persons camps in the aftermath of World War II